Darryl Gutterson (8 May 1953 – 13 August 2020) was an Australian rules footballer who played for Carlton in the VFL.

Gutterson played just one game for Carlton in the 1971 season. It was against Fitzroy at Princes Park, with Carlton winning by 15 points.

References

External links

1953 births
2020 deaths
Carlton Football Club players
Australian rules footballers from Victoria (Australia)